Golden Boy is a 1964 musical with a book by Clifford Odets and William Gibson, lyrics by Lee Adams, and music by Charles Strouse.

Based on the 1937 play of the same name by Odets, it focuses on Joe Wellington, a young man from Harlem who, despite his family's objections, turns to prizefighting as a means of escaping his ghetto roots and finding fame and fortune. He crosses paths with Mephistopheles-like promoter Eddie Satin and eventually betrays his manager Tom Moody when he becomes romantically involved with Moody's girlfriend Lorna Moon.

Background
Producer Hillard Elkins planned the project specifically for Sammy Davis Jr. and lured Odets out of semi-retirement to write the book. The original play centered on Italian American Joe Bonaparte, the son of poverty-stricken immigrants with a disapproving brother who works as a labor organizer. Elkins envisioned an updated version that would reflect the struggles of an ambitious young African American at the onset of the Civil Rights Movement and include socially relevant references to the changing times.

In Odets' original book, Joe was a sensitive would-be surgeon fighting in order to pay his way through college, but careful to protect his hands from serious damage so he could achieve his goal of saving the lives of blacks ignored by white doctors. In an ironic twist, the hands he hoped would heal kill a man in the ring.

Productions
Following the Detroit tryout, Odets died and Gibson was hired to rework the script. The ideals of the noble plot were abandoned in a revision in which Joe evolved into an angry man who, embittered by the constant prejudice he faces, uses his fists to fight his frustrations. His brother became a worker for CORE, and the subtle romance between Joe and the white Lorna developed into an explicit affair capped by a kiss that shocked audiences already having difficulty adjusting to a heavily urban jazz score and mentions of Malcolm X. This was a far cry from the musical comedies Hello, Dolly! and Funny Girl, both popular holdovers from the previous theatrical season.

The Broadway production, directed by Arthur Penn and choreographed by Donald McKayle, opened on October 20, 1964 at the Majestic Theatre, where it ran for 568 performances and twenty-five previews. In addition to Davis, the cast included Billy Daniels as Eddie Satin, Kenneth Tobey as Tom Moody, Jaimie Rogers as Lopez and Paula Wayne as Lorna Moon, with Johnny Brown, Lola Falana, Louis Gossett, Al Kirk, Baayork Lee, and  Theresa Merritt in supporting roles.

An original cast recording was released by Capitol Records. One song from the score, "This Is the Life", later became a hit in a cover version recorded by Matt Monro. Art Blakey recorded a jazz version of the score in 1964 and Quincy Jones' Golden Boy (Mercury, 1964) featured three versions of the theme.

Davis reprised his role for the 1968 West End production at the London Palladium, the first book musical ever to play in the theatre.

Porchlight Music Theatre presented Golden Boy as a part of "Porchlight Revisits" in which they stage three forgotten musicals per year. It was in Chicago, Illinois in February 2014. It was directed by Chuck Smith, choreographed by Dina DiCostanzio, and music directed by Austin Cook.

In other media
Necco (New England Confectionery Company) created a short-lived candy bar inspired by Davis and the musical. It was called "Golden Boy".

Song list

Act I
 "Workout" - The Boxers
 "Night Song" - Joe
 "Everything's Great" - Tom & Lorna
 "Gimme Some" - Joe & Terry
 "Stick Around" - Joe
 "Don't Forget 127th Street" - Joe, Ronnie, Company
 "Lorna's Here" - Lorna
 "The Road Tour" - Joe, Lorna, Tom, Roxy, Eddie, Tokio, Company
 "This is the Life" - Eddie, Joe, with Lola and Company

Act II
 "Golden Boy" - Lorna
 "While the City Sleeps" - Eddie
 "Colorful" - Joe
 "I Want to Be with You" - Joe & Lorna
 "Can't You See It?" - Joe
 "No More" - Joe & Company
 "The Fight" - Joe & Lopez

Awards and nominations

Original Broadway production

Notes

References
Open a New Window: The Broadway Musical in the 1960s by Ethan Mordden, published by Palgrave, 2001

External links

 

1964 musicals
Broadway musicals
Musicals based on plays
Plays about race and ethnicity
Boxing mass media
Musicals by Charles Strouse
Plays by Clifford Odets